Stautzenberger College is a private college, for-profit, in Maumee, and Brecksville, Ohio. It is a part of American Higher Education Development Corporation.

Academics
Programs are offered in two ways.  The first is to take the core classes during a 10-month program, which usually requires hands-on training, and receive a diploma in a particular field.  Those wishing to pursue an associate degree continue taking online courses.  The second option is to complete an associate degree program in 21 months.

References

External links
Official website

Private universities and colleges in Ohio
Two-year colleges in the United States
Education in Lucas County, Ohio
Educational institutions established in 1926
1926 establishments in Ohio